In the 1950–51 season, Al Ahly won the double, by winning the league for the third consecutive time despite the strong competition with Zamalek, 
Then the Red Giants completed the double with a difficult victory in the Egyptian Cup final against El Sekka El Hadid.

Competitions

Overview

Egyptian Premier League

League table

 (C)= Champions, Pld = Matches played; W = Matches won; D = Matches drawn; L = Matches lost; F = Goals for; A = Goals against; ± = Goal difference; Pts = Points.

Matches

Egypt Cup

First round 

|}

Quarter-final 

|}

Semi-final 

|}

Final

References

Al Ahly SC seasons
Egyptian football clubs 1950–51 season
1950–51 in African association football leagues